Phwa Sian Liong or Januar Pribadi (born 26 January 1931) is an Indonesian footballer. He competed in the men's tournament at the 1956 Summer Olympics.

Honours

Indonesia
Asian Games Bronze medal: 1958

References

External links
 
 

1931 births
Possibly living people
Indonesian footballers
Persebaya Surabaya players
Indonesia international footballers
Indonesian people of Chinese descent
Olympic footballers of Indonesia
Footballers at the 1956 Summer Olympics
Place of birth missing (living people)
Association football forwards
Asian Games medalists in football
Medalists at the 1958 Asian Games
Asian Games bronze medalists for Indonesia
Footballers at the 1958 Asian Games
Footballers at the 1962 Asian Games
Sportspeople from East Java
Indonesian sportspeople of Chinese descent
20th-century Indonesian people